Yoo Ha-na  (born March 22, 1986) is a South Korean actress. She has starred alongside Jimmy Lin in the Taiwanese TV drama series My Lucky Star, and has also appeared in the music video for "White Windmill" by Taiwanese singer Jay Chou.

Personal life 
Born in Seoul, South Korea, Yoo Ha-na originally got her start in the entertainment business by posing for pictures in various magazines in South Korea. One of Yoo's photos caught the eye of Chen Yu-shan (producer for the Taiwanese drama My Lucky Star) from a magazine she picked up while at a beauty salon. Chen made arrangements afterwards with Yoo's agent to fly Yoo from South Korea to Taiwan to audition for My Lucky Star, which landed Yoo the lead female role in that drama. At the time, Yoo had already appeared in the music video "White Windmill" for Taiwanese singer Jay Chou.

Yoo went on to appear in a few Taiwanese films such as Exit No. 6 before returning to South Korea, where she starred in TV dramas such as My Too Perfect Sons, First Wives' Club, and Paradise Ranch.

On December 17, 2011, Yoo married professional baseball player Lee Yong-kyu. She delivered a 3 kg son in September 2013. Her agency announced that she decided to suspend her acting career for the time being to focus on raising her son and taking care of her family.

Filmography

Television

Film

Theatre 
 Mad Kiss (2007)
 Dead Poet Society (2007)
 Monday P.M. (2008)

Musical theatre 
 Oh! While You Were Sleeping (2005)
 Our Town (2006)
 Greese (2008)
 Wait for you (2009)

References 

1986 births
Living people
People from Seoul
South Korean expatriates in Taiwan
South Korean film actresses
South Korean musical theatre actresses
South Korean stage actresses
South Korean television actresses